Cannabis in Tunisia is illegal. Cannabis is also known as Zatla nationally or Takrouri regionally.

History
Cannabis is believed to have been introduced to Tunisia during the Arab invasions of the 9th through 12th centuries. In 1550 Leo Africanus' Description of Africa described hashish consumption in Tunis:

Cannabis prohibition was introduced in Tunisia under French rule and outlawed by decree on 23 April 1953.

Enforcement
Tunisia still uses urinalysis to prove cases of use without possession. If the urinalysis result is below 20 nanogram/liter, the defendant will be accused by inhalation which is 6 months of imprisonment.

References

Tunisia
Politics of Tunisia
Society of Tunisia